Minuscule 2766 (in the Gregory-Aland numbering), is a Greek minuscule manuscript of the New Testament, written on 147 parchment leaves (19.6 cm by 15.5 cm). Paleographically it has been assigned to the 13th century.

Description 

The codex contains the complete text of the four Gospels.  The text is written in one column per page, in 20 lines per page. Titles are written in red uncial letters. The title in Mark is written in red semi-uncial letters, but in the rest of the Gospels in red uncial letters. It contains the Eusebian Canons in red.

The Greek text of the codex represents the Byzantine text-type. Kurt Aland did not place it in any Category.
According to the Claremont Profile Method it has Kmix/Cl827/Cl827.

History 

The codex now is located in the Kenneth Willis Clark Collection of the Duke University (Gk MS 31) at Durham.

See also 
 List of New Testament minuscules
 Biblical manuscripts
 Textual criticism

References

Further reading 

 Kenneth Willis Clark, Greek New Testament Manuscripts in Duke University Library, Library Notes, no. 27 (April 1953), pp. 6-7.

External links 

 Minuscule 2766 at the Kenneth Willis Clark Collection of Greek Manuscripts 

Greek New Testament minuscules
13th-century biblical manuscripts
Duke University Libraries